Hudson United Bank (HUB) was a bank headquartered in Mahwah, New Jersey and is part of the Nondepository Credit Intermediation Industry. The bank is serving in New Jersey, the Philadelphia region, New York, and Connecticut  Hudson United Bank has 1,280 total employees across all of its locations. There are 2,879 companies in the Hudson United Bank corporate family. HUB was acquired by TD Banknorth (now TD Bank, N.A.) in 2006.

History
Hudson United Bank was founded in 1890
. During the 1990s, it had acquired numerous regional banks, including Jefferson National Bank (1995), Growth Bank (1996), Middletown Savings Bank (1998), and many others.

Acquisition by TD Banknorth
In July 2005, TD Banknorth agreed that it would buy HUB. The acquisition was finalized on January 31, 2006, and all HUB locations were converted to TD Banknorth. Today, most of the former HUB locations, including those taken over by regional banks, are now part of TD Bank, N.A.

References

External links 

 Official website: www.hudsoninsuranceservices.com

Toronto-Dominion Bank
American companies established in 1890
Banks established in 1890
Banks disestablished in 2006
Economy of the Northeastern United States
Defunct banks of the United States
2006 mergers and acquisitions